Glyphipterix hannemanni is a species of sedge moth in the genus Glyphipterix. It was described by Wolfram Mey in 1991. It is found in the Philippines.

References

Moths described in 1991
Glyphipterigidae
Moths of Asia